Below is a list of current Australian swimming records as ratified by the national governing body, Swimming Australia. There are two types of Australian records. An Australian record is the best time recorded anywhere in the world by a swimmer or team holding Australian citizenship whilst an Australian All Comers record is the best time recorded in Australia by a swimmer or team.

Current Australian records

Long course (50 metres)

Men

Women

Mixed relay

Short course (25 metres)

Men

Women

Mixed relay

Current Australian All Comers records

Long course (50 metres)

Men

Women

Mixed relay

Short course (25 metres)

Men

Women

Mixed relay

Current Australian club records

Long course (50 metres)

Men

Women

Short course (25 metres)

Men

Women

References
General
 Australian Long Course records 23 February 2023 updated
 Australian Short Course records 23 February 2023 updated
Specific

External links
 Swimming Australia web site

Swimming
Swimming records
Records
Australia